Le Cambout (Gallo: Le Canbót) is a commune in the Côtes-d'Armor department of Brittany in northwestern France, within easy reach of the towns of Josselin, Loudeac, and Pontivy. Smaller villages around the area include Bréhan and Plumieux.

The commune is divided into many smaller settlements, among them Bourg, Bas Bourg, and Tréhorel.

Amenities
The village of Le Cambout is served by a boulangerie and a tabac. 	

There is a church in the centre of the village and a separate, well-kept graveyard a little way off. There is a sports field to the west of the village and an area known as L'Étang de gué aux loupes which has facilities such as a lake, children's playground, camping facilities and Boules lanes. There are a number of British-owned gites in the village aimed at attracting foreign tourists to the area.

Population

Inhabitants of Le Cambout are called Cambutiades in French.

See also
Communes of the Côtes-d'Armor department

References

External links

Le Cambout: Village history 

Communes of Côtes-d'Armor